CRUX is a lightweight x86-64 Linux distribution targeted at experienced Linux users and delivered by a tar.gz-based package system with BSD-style initscripts. It is not based on any other Linux distribution.  It also utilizes a ports system to install and upgrade applications.

Although crux is the Latin word for "cross," the choice of the name "CRUX" itself has no meaning. Per Lidén chose it because it "sounded cool," and ends in "X" which puts it in line with various other Unix flavors such as IRIX, Ultrix, Mac OS X and IBM AIX.

Installation

CRUX does not include a GUI installation program.  Instead, the user boots the kernel stored on either a CD or diskette; partitions the hard disk drive(s) to which the operating system will be installed (using a program such as fdisk or cfdisk); creates the appropriate file systems on the various partitions; mounts the CD or NFS share along with the partitions made previously for use by the package installation script; compiles a new kernel; and installs a bootloader, all via shell commands.

Package management

CRUX implements an infrastructure similar to that of BSD-based operating systems for package management.  Packages consist of a Pkgfile (which is a shell script), any patches required to adjust the program to work, md5sum hashes used to verify the integrity of the downloaded files and a footprint file listing the files to be included in the packages. These files are downloaded from a CRUX software repository, compiled, and installed using the prt-get frontend to pkgutils. The software sources are downloaded from the websites of their respective upstream at the address specified in the Pkgfile.

Releases

Reviews 
Simone Rota reviewed CRUX for OSNews:

References

External links 

 
 CRUX for Alternative Architectures: x86_64, ppc, ppc64, arm, sparc64
 
CRUX on OpenSourceFeed Gallery

Source-based Linux distributions
Linux distributions without systemd
Linux distributions